
The "Megala Erga", or "Great Works", is a now fragmentary didactic poem that was attributed to the Greek oral poet Hesiod during antiquity. Only two brief direct quotations can be attributed to the work with certainty, but it was likely similar to the Hesiodic Works and Days, with the "Megala", "great", of the title implying that it was longer than the extant poem. As such, the Megala Erga would appear to have the same relation to the Works and Days as does the Megalai Ehoiai to the Catalogue of Women.

Although the remains of the poem found in other ancient authors are meager, it can be said that the Megala Erga appears to have been concerned with both morality and the conveyance of more-or-less practical information like the extant Hesiodic poem upon which its title drew. The scholia to the Myth of the Ages in the Works and Days, à propos of the Race of Silver (WD 128), reports that in the Megala Erga a genealogy for silver was given: it was a descendant of Gaia. The other securely attributed fragment resembles many of the gnomic utterances that characterize the Works and Days:

Other fragments that have been tentatively assigned to the poem concern the strengths man possesses at different points in his life (fr. 321),  religious practices (fr. 322) and filial piety (fr. 323).

Select editions and translations

Critical editions

 .
 .
 .

Translations
 . (The link is to the 1st edition of 1914.)
 .
 .

Notes

Bibliography
 .
 .
 .
 .

Ancient Greek epic poems
Lost poems
Hesiod